Oruthee is a 2022 Indian Malayalam-language crime thriller film directed by V. K. Prakash. Produced by KV Abdul Nazar under the banner of Benzy Productions, the screenplay of the film was written by S. Suresh Babu. Marking her return to Malayalam cinema after 10 years, it stars Vinayakan, Saiju Kurup and Navya Nair. The cinematography of the film was done by Jimshi Khalid and was edited by Lijo Paul. Gopi Sundar and the band Thakara composed the soundtrack, with lyrics written by B. K. Harinarayanan, Alankode Leelakrishnan, and Abru Manoj.The movie is about a mother in city and the hardships she has to face while paying the hospital for her daughter's accident

Premise 
Radhamani is a middle class woman who is a boat conductor. She has to face shocking events and she fights to survive the trauma. Things take a deadly turn as she fights back forms the story.

Cast 
 Saiju Kurup as Sreekumar Gulf employee 
 Vinayakan as Sub Inspector Antony
 Navya Nair as C. K. Radhamani
 KPAC Lalitha as Bharathi
Master Adithyan as Appu
Baby Adithi as Malu
 Santhosh Keezhattoor as HRR Jewelerry Manager
 Vaisakh Vijayan as Vineeth, Radhamani's brother
 Kalabhavan Haneef
 Sreedevi Varma
Aparna Nair as Antony's wife
Malavika Menon as Sister Amala
Arun
Mukundan

Production

Filming 
Oruthee commenced principal photography in January 2020. The filming was concluded in one schedule on March, carried out primarily at Kochi.

Release 
The film was released on 18 March 2022 to positive reviews.

For Firstpost, film critic Anna M. M. Vetticad ranked it sixth in her year-end list of best Malayalam films.

References 

2022 crime thriller films
2022 films
Indian crime thriller films
Films shot in Kochi
2020s Malayalam-language films
Films directed by V. K. Prakash